Long Ridge can refer to:

Long Ridge (San Mateo County, California)
Long Ridge Village Historic District, Stamford, Connecticut
Long Ridge Mall, in Greece, New York
The Long Ridge portion of Mount Osmond, South Australia

See also
Long Ridge Road (disambiguation)
Longridge (disambiguation)